Madinat Asha'ab formerly called Al-Ittihād (meaning "union" or "unity"), is district of Aden in Aden Governorate, Yemen. Madinat Asha'ab was founded in 1959 as Al-Ittihād, the first capital of the British Protectorate of South Arabia.

References 

Aden
Districts of Aden Governorate